Rukavina is a South Slavic surname, derived from the Serbian and Croatian word rukav, meaning "sleeve". 

It is the most common surname in the Lika-Senj County in Croatia.

At least 63 individuals with the surname died at the Jasenovac concentration camp.

It may refer to:
Ante Rukavina (born 1986), Croatian footballer
Antonio Rukavina (born 1984), Serbian footballer of Croatian descent
Ivan Rukavina (1912–1992), Croatian soldier and politician active in Yugoslavia
Josip Rukavina (born 1942), Croatian chess player
Mathias Rukavina von Boynograd (1737–1817), Austrian general during the French Revolutionary Wars
Tom Rukavina (1950–2019), American politician
Tomislav Rukavina (born 1974), Croatian footballer

References

Surnames
Croatian surnames
Serbian surnames